The Syro-Aramaic Reading of the Koran: A Contribution to the Decoding of the Language of the Koran is an English-language edition (2007) of Die syro-aramäische Lesart des Koran: Ein Beitrag zur Entschlüsselung der Koransprache (2000)  by Christoph Luxenberg.

The book received considerable attention from the popular press in North America and Europe at its release, perhaps in large part to its argument that the Quranic term Houri refers not to beautiful virgins in paradise (Jannah), but to grapes there.

The thesis of the book is that the text of the Quran was substantially derived from Syriac Christian liturgy, arguing that many "obscure" portions become clear when they are back-translated and interpreted as Syriacisms. While there is a scholarly consensus that the language of the Quran is influenced by Syro-Aramaic, Luxenberg's thesis goes beyond mainstream scholarly consensus and was widely received with skepticism in reviews. The book asserted that the language of the early compositions of the Quran was not exclusively Arabic, as assumed by the classical commentators, but rather is rooted in the Syriac language of the 7th century Meccan tribe of the Quraysh, which is associated in the early histories with the founding of the religion of Islam. Luxenberg's premise is that the Syriac language, which was prevalent throughout the Middle East during the early period of Islam, and was the language of culture and Christian liturgy, had a profound influence on the scriptural composition and meaning of the contents of the Quran.

Thesis
The work advances the thesis that critical sections of the Quran have been misread by generations of readers and Muslim and Western scholars, who consider Classical Arabic the language of the Quran. Luxenberg's analysis suggests that the prevalent Syro-Aramaic language up to the seventh century formed a stronger etymological basis for its meaning.

A notable trait of early written Arabic was that it lacked vowel signs and diacritics which would later distinguish e.g. ب, ت, ن, ي, and thus was prone to mispronunciation. Arabic diacritics were added around the turn of the eighth century on orders of al-Hajjaj ibn Yusuf, governor of Iraq (694–714)..

Luxenberg claimed that the Quran "contains much ambiguous and even inexplicable language." He asserts that even Muslim scholars find some passages difficult to parse and have written reams of Quranic commentary attempting to explain these passages. However, the assumption behind their endeavours has always been, according to him, that any difficult passage is true, meaningful, and pure Arabic, and that it can be deciphered with the tools of traditional Muslim scholarship. Luxenberg accuses Western academic scholars of the Qur'an of taking a timid and imitative approach, relying too heavily on the work of Muslim scholars.

Luxenberg argues that the Quran was not originally written exclusively in Arabic but in a mixture with Syriac, the dominant spoken and written language in the Arabian peninsula through the eighth century.

Luxenberg remarked that scholars must start afresh, ignore the old Islamic commentaries, and use only the latest in linguistic and historical methods. Hence, if a particular Quranic word or phrase seems "meaningless" in Arabic, or can be given meaning only by tortuous conjectures, it makes sense – he argues – to look to Syriac as well as Arabic.

Luxenberg also argues that the Quran is based on earlier texts, namely Syriac lectionaries used in Christian churches of Syria, and that it was the work of several generations who adapted these texts into the Quran as known today.

With his approach of research, Luxenberg is a representative of the "Saarbrücken School" which is part of the Revisionist school of Islamic studies.

His proposed methodology
 Check whether a plausible, overlooked explanation can be found in Tafsir al-Tabari (completed ca. 883 CE).
 Check if there is a plausible explanation in the Ibn Manzur's Lisān al-ʿArab (completed ca. 1290 CE), the most extensive Arabic dictionary (this dictionary postdates the Tabari commentary by about 400 years, so might plausibly contain advances in lexical insight).
 Check if the Arabic expression has a homonymous root in Syriac or Aramaic with a different meaning that fits the context.
 Judge whether or not the meaning of the Syriac/Aramaic root word might make better sense of the passage.
 Check to see if there is a Syriac word which would make sense of the passage.
 Experiment with different placements of the diacritics (which indicate vowels, etc.) later added to the earliest text, the rasm. Perhaps there is a version of the rasm that will give an Arabic word that makes sense of the passage.
 If there is no Arabic word that works, repeat the experiment and look for Syriac words.
 Translate the Arabic phrase into Syriac and check the Syrian literature for a phrase that might have been translated literally into Arabic; the original meaning in Syriac may make more sense than the resulting Arabic phrase (such translated phrases are called morphological calques).
 Check to see if there is a corresponding phrase in the old Syrian literature, which may be an analog of an Arabic phrase now lost.
 Check to see if it is a correct Arabic expression written in Arabic script, but in Syriac orthography.

"Plausibility", "judging" and "making sense" of single word involves looking at occurrences of the same word in more obvious Quranic passages, and looking at Aramaic apocryphal and liturgical texts, which were carried over almost verbatim into the Quran.

Word analysis

Quran 
According to Luxenberg, the word qur'an ("reading, lectionary") is a rendition of the Aramaic word qeryan-a,  a book of liturgical readings, i.e. the term for a Syriac lectionary, with hymns and Biblical extracts, created for use in Christian services. 
Luxenberg cites the suggestion by Theodor Nöldeke  "that the term Qorān is not an inner-Arabic development out of the synonymous infinitive, but a borrowing from that Syriac word with a simultaneous assimilation of the type fuʿlān."

Huri
The word houri, universally  interpreted by scholars as white-eyed virgins (who will serve the faithful in Paradise; Qur'an 44:54, 52:20, 55:72, 56:22) means, according to Luxenberg, white grapes or raisins. He says that many Christian descriptions of Paradise describe it as abounding in pure white grapes. This sparked much ridicule and insult from the Western press who allege that "suicide bombers would be expecting beautiful women and getting grapes."

Khātam 
The passage in surat al-Ahzab that has usually been translated as "seal of the prophets" means, according to Luxenberg, "witness". By this reading, Muhammad is not the last of the prophets, but a witness to those prophets who came before him.

Ibrahim's sacrifice
The verse 37:103, considered to be about Ibrahim's sacrifice of his son, reads when translated into English from Arabic, "And when they had both submitted and he put him down upon his forehead". But using Syriac instead of Arabic for almost the same Arabic rasm, "he put him down upon his forehead", changes the meaning to "he tied him to the firewood".

Aya analysis 

The Quranic passage in surat an-Nur, 31 is traditionally translated as saying that women "should draw their veils over their bosoms" (Abdullah Yusuf Ali's translation, The Holy Qur'an: Text, Translation and Commentary). It has been interpreted as a command for women to cover themselves, and is used in support of hijab. In Luxenberg's Syro-Aramaic reading, the verse instead commands women to "snap their belts around their waists." Luxenberg argues that this is a much more plausible reading than the Arabic one. The belt was a sign of chastity in the Christian world. Also, Jesus puts on an apron (Greek λέντιον, lention) before he washes the disciples' feet at the last supper.

Christoph Luxenberg

Christoph Luxenberg is the pseudonym of the author of the book, and several articles in anthologies about early Islam.

The pseudonym "Christoph Luxenberg" may be a play upon the name of Georg Christoph Lichtenberg, the "destroyer of myths," since Lux (Latin) translates as Licht (German). Luxenberg himself claims to have chosen a pseudonym "upon the counsel of Arab friends, after these became familiar with my work theses," to protect himself against possible violent repercussions.

The real identity of the person behind the pseudonym remains unknown. The most widely circulated version claims that he is a German scholar of Semitic languages. Hans Jansen, professor at Leyden University, has conjectured that Luxenberg is a Lebanese Christian, whereas François de Blois, writing in the Journal of Quranic Studies, has questioned Luxenberg's knowledge of Arabic.

Reception 

Luxenberg's book has been reviewed by
Blois (2003),
Neuwirth (2003)
and following the English translation by King (2009)
 and Saleh (2011).

The most detailed scholarly review is by Daniel King, a Syriacist at the University of Cardiff, who endorses some of Luxenberg's emendations and readings and cites other scholars who have done the same, but concludes: 

The conclusion of King's article summarizes the most prominent reviews of Luxenberg's work that have been published by other scholars.

Gabriel Said Reynolds complains that Luxenberg "consults very few sources" -- only one exegete (Abu Jafar al-Tabari) -- and seldom integrates the work of earlier critical studies into his work; "turns from orthography to phonology and back again"; and that his use of Syriac is "largely based on modern dictionaries".

Robert Hoyland argues against Luxenberg's thesis that Syro-Aramaic language was prevalent in the Hijaz during the time of the Quran's inception, finding Arabic script on funerary text, building text inscriptions,  graffiti, stone inscriptions of that era in the area. He further argues that Arabic evolved from Nabataean Aramaic script not Syriac. He concludes that Arabic was widely written, was used for sacred expression and literary expression, and was widely spoken in the Middle East by the seventh century CE. He proposes that "the rise of an Arabic script in the sixth century" was likely the work of "Arab tribes allied to Rome" and Christian missionaries working to convert Arab tribes.

The Quran is "the translation of a Syriac text," is how Angelika Neuwirth describes Luxenberg's thesis – "The general thesis underlying his entire book thus is that the Quran is a corpus of translations and paraphrases of original Syriac texts recited in church services as elements of a lectionary." She considers it as "an extremely pretentious hypothesis which is unfortunately relying on rather modest foundations." Neuwirth points out that Luxenberg doesn't consider the previous work in Quran studies, but "limits himself to a very mechanistic, positivist linguistic method without caring for theoretical considerations developed in modern linguistics."

Dutch archaeologist Richard Kroes describes Luxenberg's book in a review article as "almost unreadable, certainly for the layman. One needs knowledge of eight languages (German, English, French, Latin, Greek, Hebrew, Arabic and Syriac) and of five different alphabets (Latin, Greek, Hebrew, Arabic, and the Syriac Estrangelo) to comprehend the book fully. A good working knowledge of German, Arabic and Syriac is indispensable to be able to assess the book. [...] Luxenberg's main problem, however, is that his line of reasoning doesn't follow the simple and strict method that he set out at the beginning of his book."
Conclusive remarks about the book are expressed as "certainly not everything Luxenberg writes is nonsense or too far-fetched, but quite a few of his theories are doubtful and motivated too much by a Christian apologetic agenda. Even his greatest critics admit he touches on a field of research that was touched on by others before and that deserves more attention. However, this needs to be done with a strictly scientific approach. In fact, his investigations should be done again, taking into account all the scholarly work that Luxenberg doesn't seem to know."

A March 2002 New York Times article describes Luxenberg's research:

In 2002, The Guardian newspaper published an article which stated:

In 2003, the Pakistani government banned a 2003 issue of Newsweeks international edition discussing Luxenberg's thesis on grounds that it was offensive to Islam.

Francois de Blois has postulated that Luxenberg is not German, rather a Lebanese Christian. He believes that the individual is a dilettante whose Syro-Aramaic reading "does not actually make better sense" than the standard classical Arabic reading. He notes that the theory is not novel, rather Luxenberg seems to adapt earlier works by James A. Bellamy and Günter Lüling without citing them in his bibliography, which "poses questions about [his] scholarly integrity." He posits that Luxenberg has an articulate knowledge of dialectal Arabic, passable (though flawed) command of classical Arabic, and a basic (though "very shaky") command of Syriac. He ultimately concludes that German academics have no reason to hide their identity,It is necessary, in conclusion, to say a little about the authorship, or rather the non authorship, the pseudonymity of this book. An article published in the New York Times on 2nd March 2002 (and subsequently broadly disseminated in the internet) referred to this book as the work of 'Christoph Luxenberg, a scholar of ancient Semitic languages in Germany'. It is, I think, sufficiently clear from this review that the person in question is not 'a scholar of ancient Semitic languages'. He is someone who evidently speaks some Arabic dialect, has a passable, but not flawless command of classical Arabic, knows enough Syriac so as to be able to consult a dictionary, but is innocent of any real understanding of the methodology of comparative Semitic linguistics. His book is not a work of scholarship but of dilettantism [amateur].The NYT article goes on to state that 'Christoph Luxenberg ... is a pseudonym', to compare him with Salman Rushdie, Naguib Mahfouz and Suliman Bashear and to talk about 'threatened violence as well as the widespread reluctance on United States college campuses to criticize other cultures'. I am not sure what precisely the author means with 'in Germany'. According to my information, 'Christoph Luxenberg' is not a German, but a Lebanese Christian. It is thus not a question of some intrepid philologist, pouring over dusty books in obscure languages somewhere in the provinces of Germany and then having to publish his results under a pseudonym so as to avoid the death threats of rabid Muslim extremists, in short an ivory-tower Rushdie. Let us not exaggerate the state of academic freedom in what we still like to call our Western democracies. No European or North American scholar of linguistics, even of Arabic linguistics, needs to conceal his (or her) identity, nor does he (or she) really have any right to do so. These matters must be discussed in public. In the Near East things are, of course, very different.

Blois (2003) is particularly scathing, describing the book as  "not a work of scholarship but of dilettantism" and concluding that Luxenberg's "grasp of Syriac is limited to knowledge of dictionaries and in his Arabic he makes mistakes that are typical for the Arabs of the Middle East."

Walid Saleh (2011) describes Luxenberg's method as "so idiosyncratic, so inconsistent, that it is simply impossible to keep his line of argument straight." He adds that according to Luxenberg, for the last two hundred years, Western scholars "have totally misread the Qur'ān" and that, ad hominem, no one can understand the Qur'an as "Only he can fret out for us the Syrian skeleton of this text." Summing up his assessment of Luxenberg's method, he states:
 
Saleh further attests that Luxenberg does not follow his own proposed rules.

Richard Kroes (2004) describes him as "unaware of much of the other literature on the subject" and that "quite a few of his theories are doubtful and motivated too much by a Christian apologetic agenda."

Patricia Crone, professor of Islamic history at the Institute for Advanced Study, Princeton, in a 2008 article at opendemocracy.net refers to Luxenberg's work as "open to so many scholarly objections" and "notably amateurism".

Work of Christoph Luxenberg 
 Luxenberg, Christoph (2000) – Die Syro-Aramäische Lesart des Koran: Ein Beitrag zur Entschlüsselung der Koransprache. Berlin: Verlag Hans Schiler. .
 English version: 
 Luxenberg, Christoph (2004) – Weihnachten im Koran. in Streit um den Koran, Die Luxenberg Debatte: Standpunkte und Hintergründe Berlin: Verlag Hans Schiler. 2004. .
 Luxenberg, Christoph (2004) – “Der Koran zum Islamischen Kopftuch”, imprimatur 2(2004).
 Luxenberg, Christoph (2005) – “Neudeutung der arabischen Inschrift im Felsendom zu Jerusalem”, Die dunklen Anfänge, neue Forschungen zur Entstehung und frühen Geschichte des Islam. Berlin: Verlag Hans Schiler, 2005. .
 Luxenberg, Christoph (2007) – “Relikte syro-aramäischer Buchstaben in frühen Korankodizes im hejazi- und kufi- Duktus”, Der frühe Islam. Berlin: Verlag Hans Schiler, 2007. .
 Luxenberg, Christoph (2008) – “Die syrische Liturgie und die geheimnisvollen Buchstaben im Koran”, Schlaglichter: Die beiden ersten islamischen Jahrhunderte, eds. Markus Groß & Karl-Heinz Ohlig. Berlin: Verlag Hans Schiler, 2008. , pp. 411–456

See also
Criticism of the Quran
The Bible Came from Arabia
Hagarism
Günter Lüling
Michael Cook
Patricia Crone
Fred Donner
Karl-Heinz Ohlig
Gerd R. Puin
John Wansbrough
Markus Groß (de)

References

External links 
  
The Koran As Philological Quarry A Conversation with Christoph Luxenberg (Goethe Institute)
An interview with "Christoph Luxenberg" by Alfred Hackensberger (originally in Süddeutsche Zeitung, here in English translation)
Islamic-Awareness, From Alphonse Mingana To Christoph Luxenberg: Arabic Script & The Alleged Syriac Origins Of The Qur'an
 Review by Simon Hopkins (Faculty of Humanities, Hebrew University of Jerusalem)

Academic press 
 Review by François de Blois (Department of Iranian Studies, University of Hamburg)
 Review by Richard Kroes  (Archeologist, writer of "Islam en Integratie", Rotterdam)
 Review by Angelika Neuwirth (Arabist Department, Free University of Berlin)
 Review by Simon Hopkins (Faculty of Humanities, Hebrew University of Jerusalem)
 Review by Robert R. Phenix Jr. and Cornelia B. Horn (Department of Theology, University of St. Thomas)
 Hoyland, Robert: New Documentary Texts and the Early Islamic State, in: BSOAS: vol 9, part 3, 2006
 Corriente, F.: On a proposal for a ‘Syro-Aramaic’ reading of the Qur'an, in: Collectanea Christiana Orientalia No.1.

Popular press 
 Goethe Institute: The Koran As Philological Quarry A Conversation with Christoph Luxenberg
 Islamic-Awareness, From Alphonse Mingana To Christoph Luxenberg: Arabic Script & The Alleged Syriac Origins Of The Qur'an
 Lebanon Wire: Giving the Koran a history: Holy Book under scrutiny
 Newsweek: Challenging the Koran
 New York Times: Scholars Scrutinize the Koran's Origin
 Reuters: Low profile for German Koran challenger

Islamic studies books
Syriac literature
2007 non-fiction books
2000 non-fiction books
Works about the Quran